Mohan Joshi is an Indian film, television and theater actor. He has worked in Hindi, Marathi and Bhojpuri films.

Career
Joshi started his career as a theatre artist in Pune. He was noticed in the play Kuryat Sada Tingalam. Along with Anand Abhyankar and Suhasini Deshpande, the show was performed more than 1000 times.

Joshi later on got various roles in Hindi and Marathi films. His 1993 comedy film Savat Mazi Ladki directed by Smita Talwalkar was quite successful. Joshi played the lead role of a doctor husband of actress Neena Kulkarni and who is engaged in an extra-marital affair with his junior doctor played by Varsha Usgaonkar. For his work in Tu Tithe Mee (1998), Joshi's work was appreciated. Produced by Smita Talwalkar and directed by Sanjay Surkar, the film was adjudged as the Best Feature Film in Marathi at the 46th National Film Awards. In their official citation, the jury noted Joshi's and his co-star Suhas Joshi's works by quoting "Beautiful performance by Mohan Joshi and Suhas Joshi are the highlights of the film." He won his only National Film Awards till now for 1999 Marathi film Gharabaher as a Special Mention (Feature Film) "for his wonderfully controlled performance of a corrupt politician". at 47th National Film Awards. In 2009, he played the lead role of Gadge Maharaj, a social reformer and saint from Maharashtra, in the film Debu.

Joshi also played various character and side roles in Hindi films and is known for his portrayal of negative roles. For the role of Tirpat Singh in the Hindi film Mrityudand (1997), Joshi received the Screen Award for Best Villain. His villainous role of Sadhu Yadav in the 2003 Hindi film Gangaajal directed by Prakash Jha was appreciated. This socio-political film was based on the Bhagalpur blindings that happened in 1980. He has also worked in Bhojpuri films.

Joshi stepped in the Hindi television industry through the show Jamuniya in 2010 that aired on Imagine TV.

Joshi was president of the Akhil Bharatiya Marathi Natya Parishad from 2003 to 2011 and then reelected in 2013 to at present. .

Personal life
He is married to Jyoti Joshi who he met in Pune.

Filmography

Films

Television
 Eka Lagnachi Dusri Goshta
 Eka Lagnachi Teesri Goshta
 Kahe Diya Pardes
 Jeev Zala Yeda Pisa
 Aggabai Sasubai / Aggabai Sunbai - Dattatray Bandopant Kulkarni (Aajoba)
 Mazhi Tuzhi Reshimgath
 Agnihotra
 Oon Paaus
 Sant Gajanan Shegaviche
 Krupasindhu

Theatre
Aasu Ani Hasu
Gadhvacha Lagna
Godi Gulabi
Goshta Janmantarichi
Kalam 302
Karti Kaljat Ghusali
Kuryat Sada Mangalam
Mi Revati Deshpande
Nath Ha Majha
Nati Goti
Purush
Sangeet Mrichakatik
Sukhant
Tarun Turk Mhatare Ark
Double Cross
Aaranyak
Shree Tashi Sau
Natsamrat

Web series

Awards
National Film Awards
 47th National Film Awards (1999) - Special Mention (Feature Film) - Gharabaher - "for his wonderfully controlled performance of a corrupt politician".
On 16 October 2021 Zee Marathi awarded them their highest award " Jeevan Gaurav "award for their successful completion of almost 50 years in both bollywood and marathi industry.

References

External links
 
Image Bucket of Mohan Joshi

Male actors in Marathi cinema
Male actors in Hindi cinema
Indian male television actors
Male actors in Marathi theatre
Indian male soap opera actors
Living people
Year of birth missing (living people)
Male actors from Bangalore
Indian male film actors
20th-century Indian male actors
21st-century Indian male actors
Male actors in Bhojpuri cinema
Male actors in Kannada cinema
Male actors in Marathi television
Male actors in Hindi television
Special Mention (feature film) National Film Award winners
Screen Awards winners